Mestni Vrh is a settlement in the hills north of Ptuj in northeastern Slovenia. The area is part of the traditional region of Styria. It is now included with the rest of the Municipality of Ptuj in the Drava Statistical Region.

References

External links
Mestni Vrh at Geopedia

Populated places in the City Municipality of Ptuj